Dudweiler is a borough of Saarbrücken, on the Sulzbach creek. In 977, Dudweiler was first mentioned in official documents of German Emperor Otto II as the location of a chapel (Duodonisvillare).

Dudweiler received town privileges on 12 September 1962.
In 1974 it was incorporated into the city of Saarbrücken.

Since then, Dudweiler has also been the name of one of the four city districts (Stadtbezirke) of Saarbrücken.
The district of Dudweiler comprises four city boroughs (Stadtteile):
Dudweiler, Herrensohr, Jägersfreude (both were boroughs of Dudweiler before 1974), and Scheidt (a municipality in the amt of Brebach before 1974).

The coal mining industry played an important role for the growth of Dudweiler until 1968 when the last mine was closed.
Today Dudweiler is characterised by its proximity to the Saarland University campus.

Sister cities

References
Notes

External links

 

Saarbrücken